Saurexallopus (meaning "reptile different foot") is an ichnogenus of four-toed theropod footprints from the Late Cretaceous period. The type ichnospecies is S. lovei, named and described in 1996 from the Harebell Formation. The taxon was originally named Exallopus, but later renamed as Saurexallopus as the former was preoccupied by a polychaete. A second species, S.zerbsti, was named and described in 2004 from the Lance Formation. In 2012 a four-toed track from the Cantwell Formation was referred to Saurexallopus indet. It was also suggested that Saurexallopus was produced by a therizinosaur taxon. In 2013 based on skeletal proportions it was suggested that the ichnotaxon was instead produced by an oviraptorosaur taxon. In 2014 a third species was named, S.cordata, from the Wapiti Formation. In 2018 several tracks from the Blackhawk Formation were referred to Saurexallopus indet.

See also

 List of dinosaur ichnogenera

References

External links
 
 

Dinosaur trace fossils
Theropods